is the seventeenth single of the Japanese boy band Arashi. The single was released in three editions: a regular edition containing a bonus track and karaoke versions of all the songs released in the single, and two limited editions containing either a DVD with the music video or the making-of video of the song.

Single information
"Aozora Pedal" was used as the theme song for the movie Honey and Clover starring Arashi member Sho Sakurai, Yū Aoi and Yūsuke Iseya.

Track listing

Charts and certifications

Charts

Sales and certifications

Release history

References

External links
 Product information 

2006 singles
2006 songs
Arashi songs
Oricon Weekly number-one singles
Japanese film songs
J Storm singles
Songs written by Shikao Suga